Pelobium is a genus from the family of Sphingobacteriaceae, with one known species (Pelobium manganitolerans).

References

Further reading 
 

Sphingobacteriia
Bacteria genera
Monotypic bacteria genera